The Battle of Machhiwarra was fought between Mughal Empire and Suri Empire in 1555.

Battle 
After the death of Islam Shah Suri, the Suri Empire was in a civil war where various contenders to the throne fought each other for supremacy.  Sikandar Shah Suri was occupied with his struggle against Ibrahim Shah Suri when Humayun mobilized an army from Kabul.  He captured Rohtas Fort and Lahore in February 1555. Another detachment of his forces captured Dipalpur and Jalandhar.  Their advance division proceeded towards Sirhind. 

Sikandar sent a force of 30,000 under Naseeb Khan and Tartar Khan to intercept them but they were defeated by the Mughal Army at Machhiwara opening the way to Sirhind which was occupied by the Mughals. 

The subsequent victory at the  Battle of Sirhind allowed Humayun to reestablish the Mughal Empire.

References

Machhiwara 1555
1555 in Asia
Machhiwara